Råpi (also, Ropi) is a 926 meters high mountain in Norrbotten County, northern Sweden, near Kiruna.

References

Mountains of Norrbotten County